The Poznań Financial Centre is an office building in the Stare Miasto area of Poznań, Poland. Completed in 2001, it stands at 91.1 m (299 ft) tall. It is the second tallest building in Poznań.

Gallery

References

Commercial buildings completed in 2001
Skyscrapers in Poland